Shane Meadows (born 26 December 1972) is an English director, screenwriter and actor, known for his work in independent film, most notably the cult film This Is England  (2006) and its three sequels (2010–2015).

Meadows' other films include Small Time (1996), Twenty Four Seven (1997), A Room for Romeo Brass (1999), Once Upon a Time in the Midlands (2002), Dead Man's Shoes (2004), Somers Town (2006), Le Donk & Scor-zay-zee (2009), and The Stone Roses: Made of Stone (2013).

Early life
Meadows was born on 26 December 1972 in Uttoxeter, Staffordshire. In 1982, his father Arty, a lorry driver, discovered the body of Susan Maxwell, a child murder victim of Robert Black, and was initially a suspect in the murder case, which led to Meadows being bullied at school. Meadows moved to Nottingham when he was 20.

Career
Meadows enrolled on a Performing Arts course at Burton College, where he first met friend and future collaborator Paddy Considine. Amongst other things, they formed the band She Talks to Angels (inspired by a Black Crowes song of the same name), with Meadows as vocalist and Considine as drummer. Lead guitarist in She Talks To Angels was Nick Hemming, who was also a member of the Telescopes and now fronts the Leisure Society.

The majority of Meadows' films have been set in the Midlands. While they recall the kitchen sink realism of filmmakers such as Mike Leigh and Alan Clarke, their use of autobiographical material and popular music soundtracks were influenced by Martin Scorsese's Mean Streets, the film which Meadows has credited with inspiring him to become a filmmaker: "It was obviously about people Scorsese understood and had grown up with. It was the first time that I thought, 'Maybe you don't have to make a film about a genre, maybe you can make a film about your own life.' "

Much of the content of his films is semi-autobiographical and based on his experiences in Uttoxeter. Twenty Four Seven was inspired by his youth, both at a boxing club, and also playing in a local football club. Despite some huge losses, the club's coach never lost faith in them. A Room for Romeo Brass was also inspired by his youth. After Paul Fraser —
his best friend, neighbour and future writing partner – had a bad accident and was bound to his bed for two years, Meadows instead hung around with some of the town's more undesirable characters. Dead Man's Shoes is based on the more unpleasant side of his youth in Uttoxeter. It was inspired by a close friend who had been bullied, developed a drug problem and then committed suicide. Meadows said "I couldn't believe that, going back ten years later, he had been totally forgotten in the town – it was as if he had never existed. I was filled with anger against the people who had bullied and pushed the drugs on him, and with despair at what drugs had done to that small community".

Five of Meadows' films were shown at the 2007 Flourish Festival, held annually in Uttoxeter, to mark the release of This is England (a film set in 1983).

His second feature-length film, Twenty Four Seven, won several awards at film festivals, including the Douglas Hickox award at the British Independent Film Awards and Best Screenplay at the Thessaloniki Film Festival. Dead Man's Shoes, his sixth film, and third starring Paddy Considine, was nominated for a BAFTA for Best British Film. His seventh film This is England, won the British Independent Film Awards 2006 for best British independent film. Meadows was presented with the award by Sylvester Stallone and used the occasion to announce that he was to be a father. This is England also won a BAFTA for Best British Film.

The film has since had a series of sequels adapted into television serials. The first series, This is England 86 (set in 1986), aired on Channel 4 in September 2010). A second series, This is England 88 (set in 1988) was aired in December 2011. A third and final series, This Is England '90 (set in 1990), was originally due to be broadcast in December 2012, but in July 2012, Shane Meadows announced that the production had been put on hold in order for him to complete his documentary about The Stone Roses, and the actors were still waiting for confirmation as to when filming would start. The series was finally broadcast in September 2015, and was met with critical acclaim. Phil Harrison of The Guardian stated: "Shane Meadows has once again elicited some remarkable performances from his actors and the result is emotionally draining for everyone who has taken these characters to our hearts." Morgan Jeffery of Digital Spy also wrote that "...all things considered, this series - this saga - remains an astounding accomplishment from Meadows and co-writer Jack Thorne."

In an interview for his 2019 series The Virtues, Meadows opened up about abuse he suffered as a nine-year old, and how the experience has undoubtedly influenced his work.

In 2021 the BBC announced that Meadows is to direct a tv series based on a novel by Benjamin Myers and produced by Element Pictures. The Gallows Pole is a period drama set against the backdrop of the coming industrial revolution in 18th century Yorkshire. The drama follows the enigmatic King David Hartley, as he assembles a gang of weavers and land-workers to embark upon a revolutionary criminal enterprise that will capsize the economy and become the biggest fraud in British history.

Filmography

Feature films
Small Time (1996)
Twenty Four Seven (1997)
A Room for Romeo Brass (1999)
Once Upon a Time in the Midlands (2002)
Dead Man's Shoes (2004)
This Is England (2006)
Somers Town (2008)
Le Donk & Scor-zay-zee (2009)
The Stone Roses: Made of Stone (2013)

Television
This Is England '86 (2010) (four 60-minute episodes with Meadows directing episodes three and four)
This Is England '88 (2011) (three 60-minute episodes)
This Is England '90 (2015) (four 60-minute episodes; the fourth and finale was feature length / 75 minutes)
The Virtues (2019) (three 45-minute+ episodes; the fourth is feature length / 75 minutes)

Online series
Charity Shop Sue  (2019)

Short films

2007
"Valentine" – promotional music video
"Serious"  – promotional music video
"The Living Room" — documentary about musician Gavin Clark
2005
"The Stairwell" (2005) [40 seconds]
2004
"Northern Soul" (2004) [30mins]
2000
Shane's World (2000) [70 mins]
— "Macca's Men"
— "The Man With No Name"
— "The Poppa Squeeze Affair"
— "Three Tears for Jimmy Prophet"
— "Tank's Top Tips"
1999
"Le Donk Episodic One Slap" (1999) [19 mins]
"Le Donk Episodic Two Slap" (1999) [15 mins]
"Billy Gumbo" (1999) [10 mins]
"Willy Gumbo" (1999) [20 mins]
"Le Donk Rat Attack" (1999) [15 mins]
"Simon Stanway 3" (1999) [5 mins]
"Gary Golfer" (1999) [8 mins]
"Eric D'ya Get the Jisto" (1999) [5 mins]
"Stars of Track and Field" (1999) [30 mins]
1998
"Paul, Simon, Dominic and Snowy Cabrerra" (1998) [14 mins]
"Daihatsu Domino" (1998) [9 mins]
"Size Sixteen Feet" (1998) [6 mins]
"There was a Wolf in the Room Mum, and it was Dying" (1998) [2 mins]
"It was just a little Chimp, about six inches tall and he wore a little red sweater" (1998) [5 mins]
"Autumn in the Heart" (1998) [7 mins]
"Hospital Stanway" (1998) [9 mins]
"A Room for Romeo Brass rehearsals" (1998) [11 mins]
"All the Way Through" (1998) [5 mins]

1997
"Come Back Dominic Dillon" (1997) [12 mins]
"Waiting For the Winter" (1997) [16 mins]
"In the Meantime Afternoon" (1997) [20 mins] – documentary
"A Room For Romeo Brass" (1997) [13 mins]
1996
"The Rise and Fall of a Protection Agency" (1996) [20 mins]
"Where's the Money, Ronnie?" (1996) [12 mins] – final version
"Simon Stanway is Not Dead" (1996) [18 mins]
"Torino Torino" (1996) [15 mins] – documentary
"The Church of Alan Darcy" (1996) [8 mins]
1995
"The Pasta Twist" (1995) [11 mins]
"The Stretch" (1995) [16 mins]
"The Allotment Show" (1995) [2 mins]
"Sneinton Junction" (1995) [6 mins]
"Jock and John are Neighbours" (1995) [7 mins]
"Black Wiggow" (1995) [10 mins]
"King of the Gypsies" (1995) [6 mins] – documentary
"King of the Gypsies" (1995) [10 mins] – documentary
"Kill Me Now, Mummy" (1995) [7 mins]
"Karate Youth" (1995) [3 mins]
"The Zombie Squad" (1995) [11 mins]
"Where's The Money, Ronnie?"  (1995) [14 mins] – third version
"A Glyde in the Park" (1995) [5 mins]
1994
"Where's the Money, Ronnie?" (1994) [10 mins] – second version
"Where's the Money, Ronnie?" (1994) [10 mins] – first version
"The Datsun Connection" (1994) [13 mins]
"The Murderer " (1994) [5 mins]
"Little Man" (1994) [10 mins]
"The Cleaner" (1994) [2 mins]

Collaborators 

Meadows frequently collaborates with various actors and film crew members. Though he writes and directs all his work, for many of his films the splits the writing credits with another party, with the two credited jointly as writers.

He has worked twice with Toby Kebbell, Frank Harper, and Bob Hoskins. He has worked three times with Stephen Graham, Joe Gilgun, Rosamund Hanson, Chanel Cresswell, Perry Benson, and Michael Socha, and at least four times with Paddy Considine, Vicky McClure, Andrew Shim (who also had cameo roles in Dead Man's Shoes and The Stairwell ), Thomas Turgoose, and Jo Hartley.

Paul Fraser [a childhood friend] has been Meadows' co-writer and contributor for all of his films except his This is England projects, Small Time and Le Donk & Scor-zay-zee, on which Meadows worked with writers Considine and Jack Thorne (both of whom went on to successfully write and direct their own projects) or Meadows worked alone.

Many of Meadows's films have had original music provided by Nick Hemming of The Leisure Society, Gavin Clark of Clayhill or Italian pianist and composer Ludovico Einaudi. Meadows has worked many times with producer Mark Herbert and cinematographer Danny Cohen.

Crew
 Paul Fraser has written for nearly every Meadows movie from 24 7: Twenty Four Seven to Somers Town. He also worked as second unit director/assistant director for Somers Town. He appears in Once Upon a Time in the Midlands as "Bingo Checker", A Room for Romeo Brass as "Physiotherapist" (uncredited) and 24 7: Twenty Four Seven as "Photographer".

Music
Many of Meadows's films have had original music provided by:
 Gavin Clark of Clayhill, Clayhill also appeared in "Northern Soul" (short). Clark was the subject of a 2007 Meadows documentary "The Living Room".
 Nick Hemming and The Leisure Society.
 Ludovico Einaudi an Italian pianist and composer.

Recurring cast members
Shane Meadows often casts certain actors more than once in his films. Meadows has most frequently worked with Paddy Considine, Vicky McClure, Andrew Shim, Thomas Turgoose, Frank Harper and Jo Hartley.

References

External links

Biographie et Filmographie du réalisateur Shane Meadows — French Shane Meadows website ShaneMeadows.fr
Directors: Shane Meadows — profile, biography and filmography Alt-Flix.co.uk
Shane Meadows – Further Reading & Critical Bibliography shanemeadows.co.uk

1972 births
Alumni of Burton College
Living people
English film directors
English television directors
English screenwriters
English male screenwriters
English television writers
People from Uttoxeter
People from Sneinton
British male television writers